XHJQ-FM is a radio station on 89.9 FM in Parras de la Fuente, Coahuila. It is known as La Explosiva and carries a grupera format.

History
XEJQ-AM received its concession on October 5, 1959. It was a daytimer on 1500 kHz, owned by Luis Spota Saavedra. By the 1980s, XEJQ was owned by José Rodolfo Milmo y Garza and had increased its power to 400 watts from 250.

In December 2011, it was cleared for operation on FM, allowing it to operate 24 hours a day. In 2015, Milmo y Garza sold the station to Radio Difusión Comercial, S.A.

References

Radio stations in Coahuila